Operation Cerebus was a South African Defence Force (SADF) special forces operation conducted in Angola during October 1985 during the South African Border War and Angolan Civil War.

Background 
To discourage any further advances by FAPLA forces towards Mavinga after Operation Wallpaper, it was decided to further hinder Angolan airforce operations between Menongue and Cuito Cuanavale. Two captured mobile SA-9 anti-aircraft missile systems were flown into the UNITA held airfield at Mavinga by South African Air Force (SAAF) C-130 Hercules. They were then driven north-west by SADF special forces and UNITA soldiers to an area between Menongue, Longa and Cuito Cuanavale. The operation was not successful and no aircraft shot down, the Angolan's airforce avoiding the area.

References

Further reading 
 

1985 in South Africa
1985 in Angola
Cross-border operations of South Africa
Battles and operations of the South African Border War
Operations involving South African special forces
Conflicts in 1985
October 1985 events in Africa
November 1985 events in Africa